Henry Alexander Urrutia Rodríguez (born February 13, 1987) is a Cuban professional baseball designated hitter and left fielder for the Saraperos de Saltillo of the Mexican League. He has played in Major League Baseball (MLB) for the Baltimore Orioles.

Professional career
Urrutia played in the Cuban National Series for Las Tunas. He debuted in the 2005-06 Cuban National Series, and played through 2009-10.

Urrutia attempted to defect from Cuba in 2010. After the failed attempt, he was suspended. He successfully defected to Haiti in September 2011.

Baltimore Orioles
On July 24, 2012, Urrutia signed with the Baltimore Orioles, receiving a $778,500 signing bonus.

After having trouble acquiring a visa, Urrutia reported to the Bowie Baysox of the Double-A Eastern League in April 2013. After playing 52 games for Bowie, the Orioles promoted him to the Norfolk Tides of the Triple-A International League on June 28. After playing in 15 games for Norfolk, the Orioles promoted Urrutia to the major leagues on July 19. Urrutia was optioned back on Norfolk on August 17. He was recalled on September 3. He was placed on the restricted list on September 13 when the Orioles travelled to Toronto due to visa issues, and re-activated on September 16. In 2013 for the Orioles, Urrutia batted .276/.276/.310 in 24 games.

Urrutia did not appear in the majors in 2014, instead spending the season in the minor leagues with the Triple-A Norfolk Tides. On August 19, 2015, Urrutia hit his first career home run off of New York Mets pitcher Carlos Torres. It was also his first career walk-off hit. Urrutia only played in 10 games for the Orioles in 2015, registering 9 hits in 36 plate appearances. After beginning the 2016 season in Double-A with the Bowie Baysox, Urrutia was designated for assignment by the Orioles on July 19, 2016. He began the 2017 season in Norfolk before being released by the Orioles organization on May 25, 2017.

Boston Red Sox
On June 14, 2017, Urrutia signed a minor league deal with the Boston Red Sox. He elected free agency on November 6, 2017.

Diablos Rojos del México
On January 29, 2018, Urrutia signed with the Diablos Rojos del México of the Mexican Baseball League.

Guerreros de Oaxaca
On August 16, 2018, Urrutia was traded to the Guerreros de Oaxaca of the Mexican Baseball League. He became a free agent following the season.

Toros de Tijuana
On February 19, 2019, Urrutia signed with the Toros de Tijuana of the Mexican League.

Saraperos de Saltillo
On June 4, 2019, Urrutia was traded to the Saraperos de Saltillo of the Mexican League. He played in 68 games for Saltillo, slashing .407/.467/.795 with 26 home runs and 65 RBI. Urrutia did not play in a game in 2020 due to the cancellation of the Mexican League season because of the COVID-19 pandemic.

In 2021, Urrutia played in 56 games for the Saraperos, hitting .385/.435/.606 with 12 home runs and 52 RBI. For the 2022 season, Urrutia was the Mexican League batting champion after he played in 90 games for Saltillo and hit .420/.479/.733 with 25 home runs and 88 RBI.

Personal
Urrutia is the son of Ermidelio Urrutia and a cousin of Osmani Urrutia. Both his father and cousin are Cuban outfielders.
He is currently married to Suse Urrutia with two sons.

See also

List of baseball players who defected from Cuba

References

External links

1987 births
Living people
Baltimore Orioles players
Bowie Baysox players
Cardenales de Lara players
Defecting Cuban baseball players
Diablos Rojos del México players
Guerreros de Oaxaca players
Gulf Coast Orioles players
Leñadores de Las Tunas players
Leones del Caracas players
Cuban expatriate baseball players in Venezuela
Major League Baseball outfielders
Major League Baseball players from Cuba
Cuban expatriate baseball players in the United States
Norfolk Tides players
People from Las Tunas (city)
Saraperos de Saltillo players
Surprise Saguaros players
Cuban expatriates in Haiti
Charros de Jalisco players
Portland Sea Dogs players
Toros de Tijuana players
Cuban expatriate baseball players in Mexico
Gigantes del Cibao players
Cuban expatriate baseball players in the Dominican Republic